Latino Barilli (1883 – 1961) was an Italian painter.

Latino was born in Parma, son of the painter Cecrope Barilli, who became director of the Parmesan Academy of Fine Arts in 1889. Latino had a retrospective exhibition at the Galleria Nazionale di Parma in 1963.

References

1883 births
1961 deaths
20th-century Italian painters
Italian male painters
Painters from Parma
19th-century Italian male artists
20th-century Italian male artists